Spartan Race  is a series of obstacle races of varying distance and difficulty ranging from 3 miles to marathon distances. These races are held in the United States and have been franchised to 30 countries, including Canada, South Korea, Australia, the Philippines and several European countries. The series include the Spartan Sprint, the Spartan Super, the Spartan Beast, and the Spartan Ultra. Spartan Race also has a military series, hosted on military bases. Spartan also holds winter and team events.

History
Spartan Race began as a spin-off of the "Death Race", a 48-hour endurance event founded in 2007. Spartan was founded by De Sena, intended for it to be a more manageable endurance race for a wider audience. The first Spartan Race event was held in 2010 at the Catamount Outdoor Center in Williston, Vermont and represented the city of Burlington, Vermont. Roughly 500 competitors had to "run, crawl, jump and swim" and overcome a variety of obstacles. All finishers received a medal, and prizes were awarded to the top athletes.

In 2012 Raptor Consumer Partners invested in the Spartan Race company. In 2013 Reebok had become the event title sponsor, and the races were renamed the "Reebok Spartan Race Series". On December 7, 2013, Universal Sports broadcast a special on the 2013 Spartan Race World Championships. In August 2015, parent network NBC then approved a Spartan-based television series, Spartan: Ultimate Team Challenge, led by the producers of fellow NBC series American Ninja Warrior. Later in 2015, Spartan Race founded the "Spartan Agoge" which is described as a "60 hour physical, tactical, mental and team based training and testing" event, to be held in Vermont twice a year. ESPN describes the Spartan Race as "a true test of will."

Spartan Race acquired Tough Mudder, which had been forced into involuntary bankruptcy proceedings, in February 2020. It purchased Tough Mudder assets for $700,000 and the assumption of debts, including honoring prepaid tickets, which was approved by the bankruptcy court for the District of Delaware. Tough Mudder is expected to continue its races, and the 2020 season starts on April 17 in North London.

Obstacle race

Spartan Race's main events include the Spartan Sprint (3+ miles of obstacle racing, 20+ obstacles), the Spartan Super (6+ miles, 25+ obstacles), the Spartan Beast (13+ miles, 30+ obstacles), and the Spartan Ultra (30+ miles, 60+ obstacles). The obstacles themselves also vary from race to race. Frequently presented obstacles can include a fire jump, climbing under barbed wire, wall climbing, mud crawling, the "over-under-through" (a series of obstacles in which runners must first climb over a wall, then under a wall, then through a square hole placed in a wall), spear throw, rope climb, heavy object carries, "Herculean Hoist", "Tyrolean traverse", monkey bars, Traversal Wall (similar to a bouldering wall), Hobie Hop (a thick rubber band is placed around the ankles and participants hop through consecutive tires), Slip Wall (a wall built at an incline, roughly covered in grease), a zig-zag log jump, steep mud climbs (rolling mud), tractor pulls, underwater submerging below walls (dunk walls), Atlas carries, tire flips, stump balances (skipping on stumps across a pond), rope swing, and the now discontinued Gladiator Arena.

Failure to fully complete any obstacles results in a 30 Burpee penalty (or in some cases, a penalty loop) that runners complete before continuing their race. A participant can obtain a Trifecta medal after completing a Spartan Sprint (or Spartan Stadion), a Spartan Super, and a Spartan Beast in one calendar year. As of the 2016 season, the finisher medal includes both the traditional circular medal and a wedge – one-third of a larger Trifecta medal. Each Spartan event also provides races for children ages 4 to 13: half-mile races for ages 4–8, and one mile races for those older than 8.

The Spartan World Championships are held yearly, and to qualify for the event, men and women must finish top 5 in a U.S. Championship Series event or a Regional Championship in their respective category.

Spartan World Champions 

The 2017 Ultra World Championships were held in Iceland on Dec 14-Dec 17.

The first Spartan Gym was opened in 2016, in the 1 Hotel in Miami.  Additionally, Spartan Strong is a group fitness class offered exclusively at Life Time Fitness.

Event Types

Race Events

Spartan Sprint 
The Sprint combines relatively easy trail running with 20 obstacles, held on off-road terrain featuring water and mud along a 5-kilometer course, and is considered a short-distance race.

The Spartan Sprint is the first part of the Spartan Trifecta achievement, where participants are encouraged to complete 3 races, earning them The Ultimate Spartan Achievement.

Spartan Super 
The Spartan Super has 25 to 30 obstacles along 6-8 miles(generally a 10k) of rugged terrain, and is considered a middle-distance race.

The Spartan Super is known to be significantly more difficult than the Spartan Sprint.

Spartan Beast 
The Spartan Beast features  30 to 35 obstacles along 12 to 14 miles of rugged terrain.

The Spartan Beast is known to be the most difficult Spartan Race in terms of completing the trifecta; some participants can't finish and are marked as DNF.

Spartan Ultra 
The Spartan Ultra features 60 obstacles along 30 miles of rugged terrain.

Spartan Kids Race 
The Spartan Kids Race was created for boys and girls ages four to 13 to encourage exercising. The Kids Race is segmented into 3 different age groups:
 Ages 4–6: ½ Mile with Obstacles
 Ages 7-9: 1 Mile with Obstacles
 Ages 10–13: 2 Mile with Obstacles
 Ages 11–14: In select cities only, a 5 Mile Course with Obstacles

Spartan Trail 
Spartan Trail is classic trail running the way it's meant to be. Get off the pavement and explore America's wilderness over 10k and Half Marathon distances.

Series

Honor 
The Honor Series made its debut in 2016. The races occur on military bases throughout the country and are open to current military, veterans, and the general public. The course runs from 4–5 miles and contains obstacles similar to the other races.

Stadium (Stadion)
Monkey bars and burpees take the field during the Stadium Series, where Spartan turns America's ballparks into race courses. These events are typically three-mile Sprint-style races with more than 15 obstacles, and are held at baseball and football stadiums across the United States.

The series provides competitors with access to stadiums with opportunities to step onto the field where the pros play, including the Dodgers, Cowboys, Packers, Red Sox, Phillies, Mets, Nationals and the San Francisco Giants. At Fenway Park, racers had to complete burpees in the Red Sox locker room.

The name Stadion (running race) (or stade, Ancient Greek: στάδιον) is drawn from an ancient running event, part of the Ancient Olympic Games and the other Panhellenic Games.

Some of the stadium-themed obstacles include:
 The Batting Order: A series of obstacles and exercises to be completed quickly.
 Foul Ball: The participant is to carry a sandbag a specific distance across the field.
 Seventh Inning Stretch: The participant must run up and down stairs in the stadium, and then must rope climb afterwards.

Global Championship Series 

The annual Spartan Global Championship Series unfolds across more than 40 countries on the road to the Spartan World Championship. The series sees competitors facing off on the course, battling signature Spartan obstacles on varying terrains and natural conditions.

Format: 14 National Series around the world lead into stand-alone championship events in five regions paving the road to the Spartan World Championship. Elite and Age Group competitors must qualify for Regional Championships and the World Championship.

Endurance Events

Ultra 
A hybrid of race and endurance events, the Ultra covers 30+ miles of terrain and features close to 70 obstacles. The Ultra is the only Spartan event featuring strict time cutoffs that must be met; competitors are warned that not all who sign up will finish.

Competitors are encouraged to bring ‘Transition Containers’ to supply the participant with food and water at the halfway point of the race due to the general tenacity of the course.

Hurricane Heat (4-8, 12-, and 24-hour) 
The Hurricane Heat Endurance Event was created in August 2011 due to the cancellation of a prior Spartan Race caused by Hurricane Irene. In the Hurricane Heat, the goal is for the competitors’ teams to reach the finish line; individual times are not applicable. The Hurricane Heat is composed of 4–8, 12, and 24 hour courses. Each Hurricane Heat event is unique to the others in terms of obstacles and location.

Agoge 
Spartan Race brings a fully immersive training program that balances class time with hands-on practical application of those skills and lessons. The Spartan Agoge is held on The Farm in Pittsfield, Vermont, twice a year in the summer and winter—and in historic locations across the globe including Iceland, Mongolia, Isle of Skye in Scotland, and along the Great Wall of China.

Media

“Spartan on NBC Sports” is a five-race U.S. Championship series that airs on NBC Sports Network and regional Comcast SportsNetwork stations while the World Championship is broadcast on NBC. The 2017 Spartan World Championship was December 24, 2017. 

In 2016, Spartan launched an editorial website, Spartan Life, which features fitness, nutrition, and lifestyle content.  

In 2018, Spartan launched a series: “Spartan: The Championship Series,“ on ESPN and ESPN 2, which is a five-episode series, and features all the action from Spartan's championship events.

See also
Spartan: Ultimate Team Challenge, spinoff TV show
 Ironman Triathlon
 Rugged Maniac
 Tough Mudder
 Obstacle racing

References

External links
 

Obstacle racing
2007 establishments in Vermont
Spartan obstacle race franchise